Horohoro is a rural farming community 15 kilometers (9.3 mi)  southwest of Rotorua, New Zealand. Horohoro is a flat-topped mountain with perpendicular cliffs and is a prominent landmark in the Rotorua area. It is the traditional home of the Ngāti Kea Ngāti Tuarā people. The Ngāti Kea Ngāti Tuarā ancestral story tells of an incident in which Kahumatamomoe, a Te Arawa chief, washed his hands in a stream at the northern end of the Horohoro mountain. Following this story, the full name of the mountain is Te Horohoroinga-o-ngā-ringa-o-Kahumatamomoe (Washing of Kahumatamomoe's hands).

The 1929 land development project by Āpirana Ngata proposed the building of farms on Māori land. Horohoro was among the first areas addressed by the plan and migrants came to work on the project. 

Horohoro has two maraes belonging to Ngāti Kea Ngāti Tuarā: Kearoa marae and Rongomaipapa marae. Rongomaipapa marae is also affiliated with Tūhourangi and Ngāti Kahungunu.

Education

References

Populated places in Waikato
Rotorua Lakes District